Pettigrew Green Arena is a multi-purpose indoor sports and entertainment centre in Taradale, a suburb of Napier in New Zealand, that opened in April 2003. It regularly hosts volleyball, basketball and netball matches for Hawke's Bay representative teams. The main court has a capacity of 2,500. It is owned by the Regional Indoor Sports and Events Centre Trust.

The arena is home to the Hawke's Bay Hawks basketball team. It hosted an ANZ Championship netball match for the Central Pulse against the Adelaide Thunderbirds in Round 14 of the 2008 season.

References

External links
 Official website

2003 establishments in New Zealand
Basketball venues in New Zealand
Netball venues in New Zealand
Indoor arenas in New Zealand
Sports venues in the Hawke's Bay Region
Buildings and structures in Napier, New Zealand
2000s architecture in New Zealand